Gerard van Rivieren, Latinized Gerardus Rivius (active 1592–1625) was a printer in the Southern Netherlands. He was the publisher of Martin Delrio's famous witchcraft treatise Disquistiones Magicae and was at one time suspected of having printed Corona Regia, a satire on James I of England that caused diplomatic ructions. His printer's mark was a winged horse, and his motto "Totum sic irrigat orbem".

Life
Rivius's earliest work was produced in Liège in 1592, where he continued to work until 1597. In 1598 he was using an Antwerp address, and from 1599 his shop was on the main market square in Leuven.

Rivius married Johanna Bogaers. Of their children Johannes Rivius (1599–1665) became an Augustinian canon and a lecturer at Leuven University, while Petrus Rivius (1607–1666) became a Premonstratensian canon of Tongerlo Abbey.

Publications
1598: Cornelis van Wytfliet, Descriptionis Ptolemaicae Augmentum
1599: Matthaeus Galenus, Commentarius in Pauli ad Hebraeos epistolam
1599–1600: Martin Delrio, Disquistiones Magicae, 3 vols.
1604: Nicolas de Montmorency, Flos Campi
1605: Johannes Wamesius, Responsa sive consilia de jure pontificio
1614: Maximiliaan de Vriendt, Urbes Flandriæ et Brabantiæ
1620: Jacobus Jansenius, Oratio funebris in obitum D. Matthiae Hovii (a funeral oration for Mathias Hovius))
1625: Johannes Molanus, Theologiae practicae compendium

References

16th-century printers
17th-century printers
16th-century publishers (people)
17th-century publishers (people)
Book publishers (people) of the Spanish Netherlands